Leah Cevoli (born Leah Ann Cevoli) is an American film and television actor, host, and producer. She first gained notoriety on the HBO series Deadwood and doing voice overs on the Adult Swim series Robot Chicken.

Filmography 
Out of the Way (2005) as Jack's wife
Deadwood (2005–2006) as Gem Whore Leah
My Name Is Earl (2006) as Hippy Singer
1% (2007) as Dacian Old Lady 
Dead & Nowhere (2008) as Mary
Robot Chicken (2005–2009) as (voice)
Un-broke: What You Need To Know About Money (2010) as Personnel Staff
Body of Work (2010) as Haley, Producer
The Best Friend (2010) as Wedding Dress
My Trip to the Dark Side (2011) as Maria the Script Supervisor
The Family Curse (2012) as Eliza Ellis
The Glass Slipper (2015) as Leigh
 Puppet (2016) as Talia Hutton
 Remember The Sultana  (2018) as Eliza Francis
 Dance Baby Dance (2018) as Cindy
Girl Lost (2018)

References

External links

1974 births
American television people
Living people